The Dance Dance Revolution series started in 1998 and has grown to a large set of games in the franchise. This list of Dance Dance Revolution games documents games released, including systems, formats, and regions for which the games were released.

Legend

These lists are sorted by platform of release, then region, then best-known release date, then regional or renamed version title, if any. Releases that have sold more than one million copies or have been re-issued as Greatest Hits are colored orange.

Dance Dance Revolution

Dance Dance Revolution Solo

Unreleased games

Dance Dance Revolution Solo (International)
Only a test build existed in North America; this game never saw a full release outside of Asia.

Dance Dance Revolution Solo Bass Mix had a public test build in early 2000 in the United States at Konami's former test location Diversions in Chicago, IL. It was later replaced with Dance Dance Revolution USA.

Major differences from the Japanese build is the absence of 3 songs: "That's The Way '98," "Together and Forever", and "Get Off."  The Nonstop Megamix course including these songs were also not present.  All other functions and hidden modes were available for play including Maniac mode, Ultimate Maniac mode, Nonstop Megamix, and machine link play.

Dancing Stage Solo is a cancelled video game for Europe. Konami filed to trademark the name on July 9, 1999. It was registered on July 25, 2000, but expired ten years after filing. This game's Caution screen, high score background and title screen were present as unused game data in the Asian versions of Dance Dance Revolution Solo 2000.

Dance Dance Revolution Ultramix (Windows)
Released as Dance Dance Revolution Ultramix for the Xbox.

Originally Dance Dance Revolution Ultramix was going to be a Windows title, sequeling Dance Dance Revolution which had been released a couple of years before. Screenshots of the game under development were released to video game news sites showing an interface that closely resembled the previous Windows game. Later in development the game was completely changed visually and released on the Microsoft Xbox.

Dancing Stage SuperNova 2 (Europe)
This game was never released. Reason: PlayStation 2 and arcade board blacklist issues.

The European arcade release of Dance Dance Revolution SuperNova 2, titled Dancing Stage SuperNova 2, was never released due to importation issues surrounding the PlayStation 2-based engine. The arcade release of DDR SuperNova 2 uses an imported Japanese PlayStation 2 to power the game. The import ban came after the release of Dancing Stage SuperNova, the second Dance Dance Revolution arcade released in Europe to use a PlayStation 2 engine.

Dancing Stage SuperNova 2 was released for the European PlayStation 2 directly on October 3, 2008. The songlist is mostly based on the North American PlayStation 2 release of Dance Dance Revolution SuperNova 2 instead of the arcade release, but with 12 of the licenses removed and a new one, Cara Mia by Måns Zelmerlöw, added.

Dance Dance Revolution (2014) (North America)

Only a test build existed; this game never saw a full release in North America.

The test build was available to the public on mid 2015 in select Round 1 and Dave & Buster's shops in the United States. e-Amusement functionality was available.  The game was later replaced with Dance Dance Revolution A in North America, making it the first Dance Dance Revolution release in that region since Dance Dance Revolution X2.

The USA location test of Dance Dance Revolution (2014) removed 47 songs found in the Japanese release:
 DDR (2014): 27 songs (25 U.M.U × BEMANI songs and 2 Konami originals)
 DDR (2013): 6 licensed songs
 DDR X3: 10 licensed songs
 DDR 2ndMix: 3 licensed songs ("Bad Girls" by Juliet Roberts, "Boom Boom Dollar" by King Kong & D. Jungle Girls, and "Stomp to My Beat" by JS16)
 DDR (1998): 1 licensed song ("Kung Fu Fighting" by Bus Stop featuring Carl Douglas)

Dance Dance Revolution A20 (Europe)
Only a test build existed; this game never saw a full release in Europe.

The test build was available from October 7, 2019 to March 16, 2020 at Namco Funscape in London, England. It uses a European build from August 6, 2019. As with the release of Dance Dance Revolution A in Europe, it did not offer e-Amusement functionality. The location test was concluded shortly before the United Kingdom imposed a stay-at-home order on March 23, 2020, in response to the COVID-19 pandemic. Upon reopening, the location test of A20 was replaced with an August 2018 edition of Dance Dance Revolution A.

While Dance Dance Revolution A20 was not released in Europe, Konami provided other updates to European machines:
 Dance Dance Revolution A received an offline update on May 21, 2021 in the United Kingdom. The build date is of April 15, 2021.
 Dance Dance Revolution A20 Plus was released on January 14, 2022 in Europe. The build date is of February 10, 2021 and it is an upgrade to Dance Dance Revolution A cabinets. Other regions received A20 Plus earlier, in July 2020. This European update is the first instance where a regional Plus version of Dance Dance Revolution is released without the original version being available.

Unofficial releases
Dance Dance Revolution Megamix, Dance Dance Revolution Extreme Plus and Dance Dance Revolution Extreme Clean are commercial bootlegs of Dance Dance Revolution Extreme.

Dance Dance Revolution Extreme Pro and Dance Dance Revolution Extreme Clarity are fan-made unofficial patches for Dance Dance Revolution Extreme. Pro enables the Marvelous timing window in all play modes, a feature that debuted in Dance Dance Revolution SuperNova 2, while also unlocking all songs automatically and using Oni scoring in all modes. It also adds support for BrightWhite, a fan-made alternative to the memory card reader. DDR Extreme Clarity improves upon Pro by adding Slow and Fast timing indicators, a feature only available in some circumstances beginning with Dance Dance Revolution X2.

Other unofficial fan-made releases are typically powered by StepMania software, and generally use official Dance Dance Revolution releases as inspiration.

Notes

Dance Dance Revolution 2ndMix was updated after its initial release with a few new songs and the ability to connect to and play alongside Konami's DJ simulator games, Beatmania IIDX. While the official name of that version of DDR when alone was Dance Dance Revolution 2ndMix Link Version, when connected to the two Beatmania IIDX cabinets it was compatible with it was referred to by two other unique names.
Along with the "International Versions" of Japan's DDR series, Korea specific versions of Dance Dance Revolution 3rdMix were released with a partly exclusive song list. Some of the Korean songs were later featured in the Japanese and international Dance Dance Revolution 4thMix, as well as the Plus and Solo versions. They have not been used in the DDR series since.
Due to a licensing mishap during the launch of Dance Dance Revolution Ultramix, the game was temporarily unavailable to Canadian players, forcing them to wait for Konami to secure the rights to certain songs and rerelease the game for all of North America.
The "second release" versions of Dance Dance Revolution SuperNova and Dancing Stage SuperNova in North America and Europe were a game disc replacement to fix audio syncing issues with the initial release of the game. Along with bug fixes, the discs added new songs to both versions.

References

External links
DanceDanceRevolution/Dancing Stage Game Database
All Versions, Songlists, FAQs, and Gamesaves
Konami Arcade Hardware

Dance Dance Revolution games